, was one of the earliest disciples of Kanō Jigorō. He was part of the Kōdōkan Shitennō or Four Guardians of the Kodokan along with Yoshitsugu Yamashita, Tsunejirō Tomita, and Shirō Saigō.

Biography

Early life
Yokoyama was born in Saginomiya, Tokyo, Japan in 1864. He trained in Tenjin Shin'yō-ryū jujutsu under Keitaro Inoue in the Yushima Tenjin dojo, as well as Kitō-ryū under Tomiharu Mikami, all since his childhood. It's said that when he was just thirteen he wielded a katana and cut down a burglar that was trying to rob his parents' house. He later joined the police in Yamagata prefecture and possibly became a student of Daitō-ryū Aiki-jūjutsu of Takeda Sokaku for a time. Anyway, in April 1886, he came to the Kōdōkan dojo in order to present a dojoyaburi challenge, but pledged himself to Jigoro Kano's teachings when he was bested right there by the much smaller Shirō Saigō. Yokoyama further assisted Kano in establishing the Kōdōkan and its reputation.

He was known for his large size, violent fighting style and will to train and fight anytime. When he was not training at the dojo, Yokoyama was outside swinging around a heavy tetsubo in order to increase his strength, and he was said to carry always a thick rope in his attire, which he would use to drag and move rocks and logs he found in the road. His favourite throw (supposedly lost after his death) was referred as "tengu nage," a name come from another of his nicknames, which was given by several superstitious porters when he beat them for disrespecting him in Hakone. Yokoyama was also an infamously harsh trainer who often attacked students without warning, telling them that they should watch in all times as if they were in the dojo.

Judo challenges
Yokoyama fought on behalf of the Kodokan for the first time also in 1886, when he was a part of the Kodokan team which fought the school Yoshin-ryu in the Kodokan-Totsuka rivalry. His most famous opponent, however, was not a member of Yoshin-ryu, but the Ryoi Shinto-Ryu jujutsuka Hansuke Nakamura, who had been called up by Totsuka as a reinforcement. Nicknamed the "Demon Slayer" and considered the toughest martial artist in Japan, Nakamura was as tall and heavy as Sakujiro himself, and it was said he was so strong that he could be hung by his neck without feeling any pain. Although much older than Yokoyama, Nakamura was also much heavier and had also subjected himself to a hard training in order to avenge a defeat suffered at Tomita's hands years before.

The match, refereed by Tetsutaro Hisatomi from Sekiguchi-ryu, lasted a total of 55 minutes. After struggling on their feet, Yokoyama threw Nakamura down with deashi barai and was about to pin him with kami-shiho-gatame, but Nakamura immediately reversed and pinned Yokoyama with his own kami-shiho-gatame. Although Sakujiro was able to escape with great effort and score a harai goshi that floored the jujutsuka, he did not follow him to the ground, as he now knew Hansuke was dangerous at ne-waza. Similarly, Hansuke remained on one knee on the ground challenging him to grapple, knowing Sakujiro was superior on the stand-up. With Nakamura being stood up by the referee, the two fighters resumed trying to escape from their opponent's field of strength while attempting to bring him to their own until the draw was called. In total, they fought half an hour standing and 25 minutes on the ground, and they were rendered so tired that the referee had to forcefully pry their numb fingers apart to separate them when the match ended. Sakujiro later wrote that he thought he was going to die during the bout.

After Sakujiro was awarded the 4º dan in 1888, he competed in a similar match against Senjuro Kanaya from the Takenouchi-ryū school. The match, which happened around 1890, was distinctly brutal. After Yokoyama blocked a tomoe nage attempt, his opponent's specialty, he tried a daki age, but Kanaya scissored his neck with his legs. Checking up he couldn't break the hold or pick Kanaya up, Yokoyama pushed forward until placing his opponent's head against the main pillar of the dojo and started ramming it against the column. As this happened at the last minute before the end of the match, the referee ended it in a draw. Nevertheless, this violent finish increased Sakujiro's reputation as the most feared fighter in Kodokan.

In 1894, Yokoyama met Hansuke Nakamura again a rematch of their 1886 encounter, and this time Sakujiro defeated him. The match was described as shorter and less energetic than the previous, reflecting their older ages. The same year, Nakamura was invited to do an exhibition in a Kodokan dojo, being paired with Yokoyama's own former master, Keitaro Inoue.

Late life
Yokoyama was awarded the seventh grade in October 1904, which was the highest dan in judo at the time.

E.J. Harrison, the English journalist, author and judoka, used a Judo anecdote from Yokoyama in his book The Fighting Spirit of Japan (published in 1913):

In his final years, Yokoyama faced the feared Fusen-ryū master Mataemon Tanabe, who had made a name out of defeating judokas in the past. Tanabe came to perform a challenge at a Kodokan dojo in which Yokoyama and Tsunetane Oda were training, and he submitted all of their students in little time each with juji-gatame. When it came to the two, Yokoyama offered himself to fight first. Tanabe immediately took the bout to the ground and tried to apply his favourite techniques, but Sakujiro blocked his efforts and waited for a chance to return to standing. At that moment, Yokoyama seized Tanabe and executed a yoko-sutemi-waza technique with the help of his superior weight. The move was hard enough to leave Tanabe unable to continue the match, and Yokoyama was declared winner.

Death
Yokoyama died in 1912, killed in a duel

References 

Japanese male judoka
1864 births
1912 deaths